Agnes of Faucigny (died 11 August 1268) was suo jure ruling Dame of Faucigny from 1253, as well as countess consort of Savoy by marriage to Peter II, Count of Savoy.

Life
She was born the eldest daughter of Aymon II, Seigneur de Faucigny, and Beatrix d'Auxonne. From her father, she was descended from the Seigneur de Faucigny and the Counts of Geneva. Her siblings were a younger sister Beatrice and an illegitimate brother Aymon de Faucigny; therefore her father appointed her heir in default of male heirs. 

Betrothed in February 1234, Agnes was married to Peter II, Count of Savoy sometime after 25 June 1236. Her husband succeeded as Count of Savoy in 1263, making her Countess of Savoy, a position she would enjoy for five years until her death. 

She had a daughter, Beatrice or Beatrix (c. 1237 – 21 November 1310), who married firstly Guigues VII of Viennois and secondly Gaston VII of Béarn; but due to the Salic law of succession, Beatrice was excluded from the succession to the County of Savoy, which would pass to Philip I, Count of Savoy after her husband's death. Originally intending to give a third of her inheritance to her daughter Beatrice and two thirds to her husband Peter, Agnes instead named her daughter as the sole heir to her lands in Faucigny, together with her daughter's husband the Dauphin de Viennois. This would lead to future territorial dispute between the House of Savoy and the Dauphin de Viennois over the territory, which the House of Savoy won back from the French at the Treaty of Paris (1355).  

She died on 11 August 1268 and was buried at Abbaye de Contamine-sur-Arve, Faucigny.

Ancestry

Notes

References

13th-century births
1268 deaths
Countesses of Savoy
Faucigny, Lady of, Agnes of Faucigny
13th-century women rulers